Tsin dynasty may refer to:

Qin dynasty (221–206 BC)
Jin dynasty (266–420)
Jin dynasty (1115–1234)
Qing dynasty (1636–1912)

See also
Jin § States
Qin § Dynasties and states